Prodigal Summer (2000) is the fifth novel by American author Barbara Kingsolver.  Heavily emphasizing ecological themes and her trademark interweaving plots, this novel tells three stories of love, loss and connections in rural Virginia.

Plot summary

Prodigal Summer tells the story of a small town in Appalachia during a single, humid summer, when three interweaving stories of love, loss and family unfold against the backdrop of the lush wildness of Virginia mountains. The narrative follows Deanna, a solitary woman working as a park ranger; Lusa, a recently widowed entomologist at odds with her late farmer husband's tight-knit family; and Garnett, an old man who dreams of restoring the lineage of the extinct American Chestnut tree.

Kingsolver's extensive education in biology is on display in this book, laden with ecological concepts and biological facts. Her writing also exhibits her knowledge of rural Virginia, where she grew up. In the acknowledgments Kingsolver thanks her Virginia friends and neighbors, as well as Fred Herbard of the American Chestnut Foundation.

See also
 Appalachia

Notes

External links

 Prodigal Summer at the author's official site
 New York Times review of Prodigal Summer
 Science & Film interview about film adaptation of Prodigal Summer

2000 American novels
Novels by Barbara Kingsolver
Novels set in Virginia